Jackson University or variant, may refer to:

 Jackson State University, historically black university, Mississippi, USA
 Andrew Jackson University, online university, California, USA
 University School of Jackson, college prep school, Tennessee, USA
 University of Washington Henry M. Jackson School of International Studies

See also 
 Jackson College (disambiguation)
 Jackson School (disambiguation)